Drop Dead Fred is a 1991 black comedy fantasy film directed by Ate de Jong, produced by PolyGram and Working Title Films and released and distributed by New Line Cinema, starring Phoebe Cates as a young woman named Elizabeth Cronin and Rik Mayall as her imaginary friend Drop Dead Fred, with Carrie Fisher, Ron Eldard, Tim Matheson, and Bridget Fonda in supporting roles. The film follows Elizabeth as she is haunted by Fred in adulthood. It received negative reviews from critics.

Plot
Unassertive and repressed Minneapolis court reporter Elizabeth Cronin visits her husband Charles, from whom she is separated, on her lunch break, hoping to sort out their problems. He reasserts his desire for a divorce and says that he is in love with another woman, named Annabella.

While she is at a public phone, first a man breaks into her car to steal her purse, and another steals the car itself. Forced to run back to work at the courthouse, she arrives late and gets fired. As she leaves the courthouse, she runs into childhood friend Mickey Bunce, who brings up memories they shared, including those of Elizabeth's imaginary friend, Drop Dead Fred. Mickey reminds her how everybody else thought she was crazy. A series of flashbacks show that, though he caused havoc, he also gave her happiness and a release from her oppressive and emotionally abusive mother, Polly.

After a pep talk from her friend Janie, Elizabeth moves back in with her mother, who is unsympathetic and blames her for her divorce. Her mother gives her a makeover in an attempt to win Charles back, styling Elizabeth exactly like her. She finds a taped-shut jack-in-the-box, and removes the tape, releasing Fred. He is confused that Elizabeth is now grown up, but proceeds to wreak havoc just as he did when she was a child. Eventually, Fred reveals that he can't leave until Elizabeth is happy again, so he agrees to help her win back her husband. However, his childish antics do more harm than good. He sinks Janie's houseboat, causes havoc at a restaurant, tricks her into assaulting a violinist in a shopping mall, rips the uniform off a waiter at a wine tasting event, and in general embarrasses Elizabeth and makes her look insane.

Worried by Elizabeth's recent odd behavior, Polly takes her to a (children's) psychologist. In the waiting room, Fred is reunited with his friends: the imaginary friends of other patients, who are all children. The doctor prescribes medication to rid her of Fred, whom he and Polly believe is a figment of her imagination. The medication also has the effect of slowly killing Fred.

Fred reminds Elizabeth that one day, while they were making a mess on the dinner table, she heard her mother coming and she imagined him hiding in a jack-in-the-box. Polly, fed up with Elizabeth playing with Fred, took the jack-in-the-box and taped it shut, essentially taking Fred away from her and causing her father, Nigel, to leave the family in anger. The event left Elizabeth traumatized. Fred shows her a letter she wrote to him not long after, promising they'd run away together if he ever came back. Elizabeth and Fred run away from Polly's and go to Charles' party, where Fred causes more havoc.

Charles asks Elizabeth to come back and she is overjoyed until Fred discovers he is still cheating with Annabella. Heartbroken, she tells Fred that she cannot leave Charles because she is scared of being alone. Fred helps her escape to a dream world in which she is able to reject Charles and stand up to Polly, declaring she is no longer afraid of her. She frees her imprisoned childhood self. Fred tells her that she no longer needs him, so they kiss and he disappears.

Upon awakening, Elizabeth dumps Charles and stands up to Polly. Polly begs Elizabeth not to leave her alone and Elizabeth encourages her to find a friend to escape her own loneliness. She goes on a walk with her friend Janie, who reveals that due to an unexpected set of loopholes in her houseboat insurance, she has received a payout that will make her wealthy. After revealing the news to Elizabeth, she gleefully shouts "Thank you, Drop Dead Fred!", as this wouldn't have been possible with the boat disaster earlier in the film. Elizabeth later visits Mickey, who has embraced spontaneity after coming into contact with Elizabeth and Fred. Mickey tells Elizabeth that he would like to be "one of the options" she has now that she's free of Charles and her mother, to which she agrees. His daughter Natalie's nanny quits, claiming she is too wild, and Natalie blames Drop Dead Fred for the mischief. Elizabeth realizes Fred is now with Natalie, although she cannot see him anymore. She tells Natalie she believes Fred is real and to give him her love. The nanny attempts to leave the front yard, but her leg is caught in a rope pulley trap set by Natalie and Fred, with her hanging upside down from the tree shouting for help as Mickey attempts to help her down. Natalie is seen giggling hysterically with her hand held out like she's got her pinky held by Fred in a pinky-swear-type gesture.

Cast
 Phoebe Cates as Elizabeth Cronin
 Ashley Peldon as Young Elizabeth
 Rik Mayall as Drop Dead Fred
 Marsha Mason as Polly Cronin
 Ron Eldard as Michael "Mickey" Bunce
 Carrie Fisher as Janie
 Tim Matheson as Charles Gretterson
 Daniel Gerroll as Nigel Cronin
 Keith Charles as Murray
 Cheryl Hawker as Nurse
 Peter Breitmayer as Go to Hell Herman
 Clark Niederjohn as Velcro Head
 Tom Bethke as Graggy
 Elizabeth Gray as Namby Pamby
 Bridget Fonda as Annabella (uncredited)
 Eleanor Mondale as Attractive customer
 Bob Reid as Judge Dubben
 Peter Thoemke as Arsonist

Production
Tim Burton and Robin Williams were offered the roles of director and Fred, respectively. They turned the project down.

The film's screenplay was rewritten by director Ate de Jong and producer Paul Webster throughout pre-production. For the re-writes, de Jong took inspiration from being molested as a child by his older half-brother, stating "the trauma of child abuse goes deep and its claws reach far in time. It was not something ever spoken about on the set, not with Rik or anyone, but for me it existed."

Filming took place in August and September 1990. Filmed in Minneapolis, a large part of Drop Dead Fred was filmed at Prince's Paisley Park Studios in the suburb of Chanhassen. It had been a rumor since the film's release that Prince visited the set, but Webster debunked this in an interview with The Telegraph in 2021.

Reception

Box office

Drop Dead Fred, produced on a budget of just under $6.8 million, was released theatrically in North America on May 24, 1991, grossing $3,625,648 on its opening weekend, and $13,878,334 over its entire theatrical run. It made £1,794,121 in the UK.

Critical response
Drop Dead Fred was critically panned upon release, but has gone on to become a cult film. On Rotten Tomatoes it has an approval rating of 11% based on 36 reviews. The site's consensus states: "Tackling mature themes with an infantile sensibility, Drop Dead Fred is an ill-conceived family comedy that is more likely to stir up a headache than the imagination." On Metacritic it has a score of 25% based on reviews from 19 critics, indicating "generally unfavorable reviews".

Gene Siskel gave the film zero stars and said "This is easily one of the worst films I've ever seen." Writing for Entertainment Weekly, Margaret Lyons asked, "Is it supposed to be hilarious, or a really, really depressing story about the long-term effects of emotional abuse?" Leonard Maltin stated that "Phoebe Cates' appealing performance can't salvage this putrid mess...recommended only for people who think nose-picking is funny."

Peter Freedman of the Radio Times called it a "largely uninteresting and unfunny comedy", adding: "It's a nice idea, but it falls between all available stools and ends up as a mess on the floor thanks to the poor execution. It's particularly irritating if you've seen the much better Harvey." Angie Errigo of Empire magazine wrote: "There is scarcely a laugh to be had unless you are six years old or immoderately fond of such wheezes as depositing dog poop on a white carpet."

Writing for Mystical Movie Guide, Carl Schroeder wrote: "The imaginary friend is cavortingly rude for a reason; he served to push the girlchild to do mischief for attention and as a cry for help. Now grown up, the woman has forgotten and is about to lose her soul, so events call for some kind of literal return of her demon to force the exposure of her pain. This psychic crisis is poignantly realistic ... the creature who is visible only to the woman is like a poltergeist energy of her repressed self, a problematic ego container into which her powers of assertion and creativity were poured and stored." He went on to call the movie's resolution "startlingly beautiful."

Writing for The Telegraph in 2021, Alexander Larman praised the film, calling it "a sophisticated and ahead-of-its-time black comic exploration of anxiety and depression." Film critic Johanna Steinmetz suggested that the film's premise was inspired by children with imaginary friends who later develop dissociative identity disorder.

See also 

 Schizotypal personality disorder

 Dissociative identity disorder

References

External links
 
 
 

1990s black comedy films
1990s English-language films
1990s fantasy comedy films
1991 films
1991 independent films
American black comedy films
American fantasy comedy films
American independent films
British black comedy films
British fantasy films
British independent films
Films about imaginary friends
Films scored by Randy Edelman
Films set in 1970
Films set in 1991
Films set in Minnesota
Films shot in Minnesota
Magic realism films
New Line Cinema films
PolyGram Filmed Entertainment films
Working Title Films films
Films directed by Ate de Jong
1990s American films
1990s British films